The 1969 Arkansas Razorbacks football team represented the University of Arkansas in the Southwest Conference (SWC) during the 1969 NCAA University Division football season. In their 12th year under head coach Frank Broyles, the Razorbacks compiled a 9–2 record (6–1 against SWC opponents), finished in second place behind Texas in the SWC, and outscored all opponents by a combined total of 353 to 103.  The team finished the season ranked #7 in the final AP Poll and #3 in the final UPI Coaches Poll and went on to lose to Ole Miss in the 1970 Sugar Bowl.

Schedule

Roster
QB Bill Montgomery, Jr.

John Eichler		QB	
Steve Walters		QB	
Bill Burnett*		RB	
Bruce Maxwell*		RB	
Paul Blevins		RB	
Russ Garber			RB 
Russell Cody		RB	
Mike Hendren		RB	
Dick Fuller			RB
Chuck Dicus*		WR	
John Rees*		    WR
David Cox		    WR	
Steve Hockersmith	WR	
Mike Schaufele		WR	
W. Powell		    WR	
Pat Morrison*		TE	
Bobby Nichols		TE	
Rodney Brand*		OL	
Jerry Dossey*		OL	
Ronnie Hammers*		OL	
Mike Kelson*		OL	
Bob Stankovich*		OL	
Terry Hopkins		OL	
Jim Mullins		    OL	
Dick Bumpas*		DL	
Bruce James*		DL	
Rick Kersey*		DL	
Gordon McNulty*		DL	
Roger Harnish		DL	

Mike Boschetti*		LB	
Lynn Garner*		LB	
Cliff Powell*		LB	
Richard Coleman		LB	
Ronnie Jones		LB	
Dennis Berner*		DB	
Bobby Field*		DB	
Jerry Moore*		DB	
Terry Stewart*		DB	
Steve Birdwell		DB	
Dave Hogue		    DB	
Cary Stockdell		P

Game of the Century

With two legendary coaches (Broyles and Royal), two neighboring states, two football powerhouses (8 of last 10 SWC Championships), and two recent National Championships (Arkansas in 1964 and Texas in 1963),  Arkansas and Texas had developed a rivalry. The game was moved from the usual third week in October to the first week in December so it could be televised nationally on ABC. President Richard Nixon attended the game, and AstroTurf was even installed in Razorback Stadium in preparation for the game.

Arkansas' top-rated defense was going up against the #1-rated Texas offense, but the Hogs got on top early, with a 1-yard TD run by Bill Burnett. After halftime, Chuck Dicus hauled in a 29-yard touchdown pass, giving the Razorbacks a 14–0 lead heading into the game's final quarter. Longhorn QB James Street then led his squad to its first touchdown, and as coach Darrell Royal had planned, Texas attempted and completed the two-point conversion, which would in all likelihood prevent a tie.

Arkansas then had the ball and the lead, and a 73-yard drive later, the Hogs were in good position to tack on a field goal that would put the game out of reach, but Razorback QB Bill Montgomery was intercepted in the end zone, giving the Longhorns new life. The Texas drive appeared stalled at the Longhorns' own 43, on a 4th and 3, when Royal gambled again. A 44-yard pass to Randy Peschel, who caught the ball in double coverage, put Texas at the Arkansas 13. Longhorn RB Jim Bertelsen would run in for the tying six points. The extra-point snap was high, but was snared by third-string QB Donnie Wigginton and the kick was converted by Longhorn kicker Happy Feller, giving Texas a 15–14 lead with 3:58 to play.

Arkansas drove to the Texas 40, looking for a field goal from All-American kicker Bill McClard, but the turnover bug struck again as Montgomery was again picked off.

Sugar Bowl

Rivals Ole Miss and Arkansas met in the 1970 Sugar Bowl.

Ole Miss RB Bo Bowen scampered 69 yards to open the scoring, with Archie Manning adding another 18-yard TD run. Down 14–0, Arkansas responded with a 12-yard TD run by Bill Burnett, but the extra point was missed, and after a Rebel field goal and Archie Manning 30-yard TD strike, were down 24–6. Before halftime, Chuck Dicus hauled in a 47-yard pass from Bill Montgomery, but the two-point conversion was incomplete, and the Rebels took a 24–12 halftime lead.

The third quarter produced a field goal from each team, and in the fourth quarter fullback Bruce Maxwell caught a six-yard strike from Montgomery to cut the lead to five, but the rally fell short, the Hogs losing by a 27–22 final.

References

Arkansas
Arkansas Razorbacks football seasons
Sugar Bowl champion seasons
Arkansas Razorbacks football